The Constitutional Court of Korea is one of the highest courts—along with the Supreme Court—in South Korea's judiciary that exercises constitutional review, seated in Jongno, Seoul. The South Korean Constitution vests judicial power in courts composed of judges, which establishes the ordinary-court system, but also separates an independent constitutional court and grants it exclusive jurisdiction over matters of constitutionality. Specifically, Chapter VI Article 111(1) of the South Korean Constitution specifies the following cases to be exclusively reviewed by the Constitutional Court:
 The constitutionality of a law upon the request of the courts;
 Impeachment;
 Dissolution of a political party;
 Competence disputes between State agencies, between State agencies and local governments, and between local governments; and
 Constitutional complaints as prescribed by [the Constitutional Court] Act.
Article 111(2) states that the Constitutional Court shall consist of nine justices qualified to be court judges, all of whom shall be appointed by the president of South Korea. Even though all nine justices must be appointed by the president, Article 111(3) states that the National Assembly and the Chief Justice shall nominate three justices each, which implies the remaining three are nominated by the president of South Korea. Article 111(4) states that the candidate for the president of the Constitutional Court must obtain the approval of the National Assembly before the President appoints them.

The South Korean Constitution broadly delineates the roles of courts, both ordinary courts and the Constitutional Court, and entrusts the National Assembly to legislate the specifics of their functions. The National Assembly, soon after the ninth constitutional amendment that ended decades of dictatorship in South Korea, passed the Constitutional Court Act, which spells out a detailed organizational structure of the Court, establishes the hierarchy of judicial officers and their roles within the Court, and most importantly, provides ways in which people of Korea can appeal to the Court. Unlike other constitutional courts (most notably Federal Constitutional Court of Germany), a party may file a constitutional complaint directly with the Court, without having to exhaust all other legal recourse, when a particular statute infringes upon his or her constitutional rights.

Although the Constitutional Court and the Supreme Court are treated as coequal (see Article 15 of the Constitutional Court Act), the two courts have persistently come into conflict with each other over which of them is the final arbiter of the meaning of the Constitution. The Supreme Court, which is supposed to be the court of last resort, has criticized the Constitutional Court for attempting to upend the "three-tiered trial" system—referring to the conventional practice of allowing appeals up to twice—and placing itself above the Supreme Court. In 2022, the relationship between the two high courts seemingly came to a head when the Constitutional Court overturned a Supreme Court decision without declaring the relevant statute unconstitutional, holding that the statute itself does not violate the Constitution but its particular application does. The Supreme Court publicly denounced the ruling, saying that it entails the unacceptable implication that the ordinary courts' decisions fall under the Constitutional Court's jurisdiction, which subjugates the Supreme Court to the Constitutional Court. 

The Constitutional Court of Korea is the seat of the Permanent Secretariat for Research and Development of the Association of Asian Constitutional Courts and Equivalent Institutions.

History 
After regaining independence from the Japanese colonial rule in 1945, there were multiple attempts to establish an independent constitutional court to exercise judicial review. Members of the Constitutional Drafting Committee prior to the first republic debated whether Korea's system of constitutional review should be modeled after the United States or continental Europe. Kwon Seung-ryul's proposal followed the American judicial system where only the Supreme Court interprets the constitution, whereas Yoo Jin-oh's proposal followed the European model with a constitutional court. The Constitutional Committee of the first republic was the result of a compromise between the two proposals. According to the 1948 Constitution, the vice president chaired the Constitutional Committee, the National Assembly appointed five assemblymen as committee members (after the 1952 constitutional amendment, three from the House of Representatives and two from the House of Councillors), and the chief justice of the Supreme Court recommended five from the Supreme Court justices to the Committee.

Syngman Rhee's dictatorial rule, however, sabotaged the Committee's normal operation, and as a result, the Committee was able to adjudicate only six cases, two of which ruled the statutes at issue unconstitutional. The 1952 constitutional amendment established a bicameral legislature but Syngman Rhee's regime, until its demise, refused to enact the House of Councillors election law. As a result, the upper house, required for the Constitutional Committee to function, was never formed, and the Constitutional Committee soon ground to a halt.

After Rhee was overthrown in the April Revolution, the second republic was established through a constitutional amendment transitioning from a presidential to parliamentary system. As a part of the amendment, the Constitutional Court was established to replace the now-defunct Committee. According to the 1960 constitutional amendment, the President, House of Councillors and the Supreme Court each designated three Constitutional Court judges. Although legislation to form the Court was passed in April of 1961, the Court never came into existence as Park Chung-hee, who later became President, launched a coup the following month and suspended the constitution.

After the nominal dissolution of the military junta, President Park Chung-hee jammed through the 1962 constitutional amendment, which conferred the power to review cases on constitutionality on the Supreme Court and dissolved the Constitutional Court. Following the constitutional mandate in 1971, the Supreme Court unanimously struck down Article 2 of the National Compensation Act, which restricted state liability for compensating injured soldiers while serving the country. Enraged by the decision, in the following year, Park pushed through yet another constitutional amendment, establishing the Yushin Constitution, a notoriously oppressive document that gave the president sweeping executive and legislative powers. The Yushin Constitution had an article that expressly overturned the 1971 Supreme Court decision on the National Compensation Act. Furthermore, the Supreme Court justices involved in the decision were refused reappointment and forced into retirement.

The Yushin Constitution (and the successive constitution of the fifth republic) also re-established the Constitutional Committee, but required an ordinary court to submit a formal request for constitutional review before the Committee could exercise its judicial power. Since the Supreme Court was wary of retaliation as happened in 1971, it forbade courts from making such requests, rendering the Constitutional Committee powerless.

The June Struggle in 1987 led to the 1987 constitutional amendment, which finally democratized Korea and ushered in the sixth republic, which continues to this day as of January 2023. The 1987 Constitution established the Constitutional Court of Korea as we know it and empowered the Court to review matters on constitutionality. Following such will of the South Korean people, the Constitutional Court has made significant landmark decisions in contemporary history of South Korea. Renowned latest decisions of the Court include the decriminalization of abortion and the impeachment of Park Geun-hye.

Status 
The current judicial system of South Korea, especially the Constitutional Court of Korea, was influenced by the Austrian judicial system. While Austria has three apex courts, whose jurisdiction is defined in different chapters of the Austrian constitution, the Constitution of South Korea only establishes two apex courts. Ordinary courts with the Supreme Court of Korea at the top is established by Article 101(2) under Chapter 5 'Courts', while the Constitutional Court of Korea is the one and only highest constitutional court established by Article 111(1) Chapter 6 'Constitutional Court'. 

The drafters of the Constitution tried to emphasize that the Constitutional Court does not belong to the ordinary-court system by using different but synonymous words. The term 'jaepanso', meaning court, was used to describe the Constitutional Court, while 'beobwon' was used to represent the ordinary courts. The equal status of the Constitutional Court and the Supreme Court is guaranteed by Article 15 of the Constitutional Court Act, which states that the President and the Associate Justices of the Constitutional Court should be treated the same as the Chief Justice and the Associate Justices of the Supreme Court, respectively.

Composition

Justices 
Article 111 of the Constitution of the Republic of Korea stipulates the size of the Constitutional Court and the nomination and appointment procedure for its Justices. The Court is composed of nine Constitutional Court Justices, and the President of South Korea formally appoints each Justice. However, Article 111(3) of the Constitution divides the power to nominate persons for appointment into equal thirds among the President, the National Assembly, and the Chief Justice of the Supreme Court of Korea. Thus, the President has the power to both nominate and appoint three of the Constitutional Court's nine Justices, but the President must appoint the remaining six Justices from persons selected by the National Assembly or the Chief Justice of the Supreme Court. This appointment structure reflects the civil law tradition of regarding ordinary courts as heart of conventional judiciary, since the President of South Korea represents executive branch, and the National Assembly represents legislative branch, while the Supreme Court Chief Justice represents judicial branch of the South Korean government. However, it is clear that both the Supreme Court and the Constitutional Court generally regard the power of the Constitutional Court as essentially a kind of judicial power. 

In order for a person to be appointed as a Constitutional Court Justice, Article 5(1) of the Constitutional Court Act requires that the person must be at least 40 years old, qualified as attorney at law, and have more than 15 years of career experience in legal practice or legal academia.

While exact internal procedure for the nomination of Constitutional Court Justices is not stipulated by statutes, nomination of the three Justices from the National Assembly is usually determined by political negotiations between the ruling party in the Assembly and the first opposition party. The second opposition party also plays a role in this process when it has sufficient membership in the Assembly. When the second opposition party does not have sufficient membership in the Assembly to formally participate in nomination process, the ruling party nominates one Justice, and the first opposition party nominates another. The remaining nomination is shared between the two parties, decided by negotiation or by election when the negotiation fails. For example, former Justice Kang Il-won was nominated by the National Assembly according to negotiations between the ruling Saenuri Party and the first opposition Democratic United Party in 2012. When the second opposition party is big enough to formally participate in the appointment process, it nominates the third Justice. Current Justice Lee Young-jin is example of Justice nominated from the National Assembly by the second opposition party; the Bareunmirae Party nominated him in 2018.

Notably, Article 6(2) of the Constitutional Court Act states there should be "confirmation hearings of the National Assembly" for all Constitutional Court Justices before appointment or nomination. However, this procedure has been interpreted as non-binding where the Constitution itself does not require the National Assembly's confirmation or consent for the nomination or appointment. Thus, the National Assembly cannot use the confirmation hearing process to block the nominations advanced by the President or the Chief Justice of the Supreme Court, or the President's appointment of such nominees.

Council of Constitutional Court Justices 
The "Council of Constitutional Court Justices" is established according to article 16(1) of the Constitutional Court Act. It is composed of all nine Justices (including the President of the Constitutional Court as permanent presiding Chair), and can make decisions by simple majority among a quorum of two-thirds of all Supreme Court Justices, according to article 16(2) and (3) of the Act. The main role of the Council is supervisory functions for the President of the Court's power of court administration, such as the appointment of the Secretary General, the Vice Secretary General, Rapporteur Judges and other high-ranking officers over Grade III. Other issues requiring supervisory functions of the Council include making interior procedural rules and planning on fiscal issues.

President of the Constitutional Court 

Article 111(4) empowers the President of South Korea to appoint the President of the Constitutional Court of Korea among nine Constitutional Court Justices, with consent the National Assembly. By article 12(3) of the Constitutional Court Act, President of the Court represents the Court and supervises court administration. Also by article 16(1), the President of the Court is chair of the Council of Constitutional Court Justices. Finally, by article 22 of the Constitutional Court Act, the President of the Court always becomes presiding member of the Full bench composed of all nine Constitutional Court Justices.

Tenure 
Article 112(1) of the Constitution and article 7 of the Constitutional Court Act provides the term of associate Justice as renewable six-year up to mandatory retirement age of 70. However, there's only two Justices who attempted to renew their term by reappointment, because renewing attempt can harm judicial independence of the Constitutional Court. During the term, according to article 112(1) and 112(2) of the Constitution, Justices shall not be expelled from office unless by impeachment or a sentence of imprisonment, and they shall not join any political party, nor shall participate in political activities to protect political neutrality of the Court.

One of sophisticated issue on the Court's tenure system is term length of the President of the Court, since the Constitution and the Act never states about exact term of the President. Shortly, the President of the Court who was newly appointed simultaneously as both Justice and the President can have full six-year term as one of the Justice, while the President of the Court who was appointed during term as Justice can only serve as the President during remaining term as Justice. For more information, see President of the Constitutional Court of Korea.

Current justices

Organization

Rapporteur Judges 

Rapporteur Judges (formerly known as 'Constitutional Research Officers') are officials supporting nine Justices in the Court. They exercise investigation and research for review and adjudication of cases, to prepare memoranda and draft decisions, which makes them as kind of judicial assistant (such as Conseillers référendaires in French Cour de cassation or Gerichtsschreiber in Swiss Bundesgericht usually working for 5 to 10 years or more until retirement, but not as law clerks in United States Supreme Court working for 1 to 2 years as intern).

Rapporteur Judges are appointed by President of the Court with consent of Council of Justices, under article 16(4) and 19(3) of the Act, and serve for renewable ten-year terms, which is same tenure system as lower ordinary court Judges in South Korea. It is noticeable that Rapporteur Judges serve longer than Justices in Constitutional Court, and paid as same as lower ordinary court Judges, since these professional assistants are designed to ensure continuity of constitutional adjudication in South Korea. Some of Rapporteur Judges position is filled with lower ordinary court Judges or Prosecutors seconded from outside of the Constitutional Court for 1 to 2 years, to enhance diversity and insight of the Court according to article 19(9) of the Act. Other than Rapporteur Judges, there are 'Constitutional Researchers' and 'Academic Advisors' at the Court, working for 2 to 5 years to assist research on academic issues mainly on comparative law related to the Court's on-going cases by article 19-3 of the Act.

Department of Court Administration 
The Court's administrative affairs are managed autonomously inside the Court, by apparatus called 'Department of Court Administration' (DCA). The Department is led by the 'Secretary General', currently Park Jong Mun, under direction of the President of the Court, provided with consent of 'Council of Justices' in some of important issues under article 16 and 17 of the Constitutional Court Act. The Secretary General is treated as same level as other Ministers at State Council in executive branch of South Korean government, by article 18(1) of the Act. The Deputy Secretary General is appointed usually from the senior Rapporteur Judges and treated as same level as other Vice-Ministers. The Department implements decisions of the Council of Constitutional Court Justices and operates various issues of court administration, including fiscal and human resource issues or other information technology services of the Court. It has also professional team for supporting international relations of the Court, including Venice commission and Association of Asian Constitutional Courts and Equivalent Institutions.

Constitutional Research Institute 
Constitutional Research Institute is the Constitutional Court's own institute established by article 19-4 of the Constitutional Court Act in year 2011, for research on fundamental academic issues concerning comparative law and original legal theories for South Korean Constitution. It also has function for training newly appointed officials of the Court and educating public on constitution. Professors at the Institute are recruited mainly from PhD degree holders educated from foreign countries, and their research and education programs are supervised by senior Rapporteur Judges as manager seconded from the Court. The Institute is currently located in Gangnam, Seoul.

Building 

Current buildings of the Constitutional Court of Korea, seated in Jae-dong, Jongno-gu of Seoul near Anguk station of Seoul Subway Line 3, is divided into Courthouse and the Annex. The five-story main building for Courthouse is designed in neo-classical style to incorporate Korean tradition with new technology. It was awarded 1st place of 2nd Korean Architecture Award in October 1993, the year it was completed. Right pillar of the main gate is engraved as  meaning the Constitutional Court itself, while the left pillar gate is engraved as  meaning the Department of Court Administration. It includes the courtroom, office and deliberation chamber for Justices, office for Rapporteur Judges, Academic Advisors and Constitutional Researchers, and one of working space for Department of Court Administration. The Annex building, built in April 2020 as three-story building tried to enhance communication with public and barrier-free accessibility. It includes law library, permanent exhibition hall for visitors and another working space for the Department. The Court usually holds open hearing session or session for verdict in 2nd and last thursday of a month, and visitors with ID cards or passports may attend the session. However, unaccompanied tour on building is restricted for security of the Court.

Procedure 
As South Korea has predominant civil law tradition, major sequence of review procedure in the Constitutional Court of Korea stipulated in Chapter 3 of Constitutional Court Act is structured into two phases. First phase is investigating preliminary conditions on admissibility of case, not on merits. For example, if the plaintiff (who made request for adjudication) lapsed deadline for request, the case is formally decided as 'Dismissed' no matter how much the plaintiff's request is right or not. This phase is named as 'Prior review' under article 72 of the Act. Second phase is reviewing and deliberating merits of case. This phase is mainly fulfilled without oral hearing, yet the Court may hold oral hearing session if necessary, according to article 30 of the Act. If a case had passed prior review phase yet could not prove merits, the cas is formally decided as 'Rejected'. Otherwise, it is decided as 'Upheld' yet the specific form of upheld decision varies with each of jurisdiction, especially in judicial review of statutes.

First phase, the 'Prior review' is delivered by three different Panel of the Court, and each of the Panel is composed of three Justices. At this phase, the Court takes inquisitorial system to investigate every possible omit of preliminary conditions. If the Panel decides unanimously that the case lacks any of preliminary conditions, the case is dismissed. Otherwise, the case goes to second phase, where the Full bench composed of all possible Justices with the President of the Court as presiding member, reviews the case by article 22 of the Act. Though the case may already passed Prior review, still it can be dismissed since other Justices who did not participated in Prior review of such case can have different opinion.

Votes and Quorum of Full Bench 
According to 113(1) of the Constitution and article 23(2) of the Act, to make decision upholding requests for the Adjudication, or to change precedent, the Court needs votes from at least six Justices among quorum of at least seven Justices. The only exception is making uphold decision in Adjudication on competence dispute. It only requires simple majority to make uphold decision. Otherwise, for example, to dismiss or to reject case, only simple majority with quorum of at least seven Justices is need to make decision. If there's no simple majority opinion, the opinion of the Court is decided by counting votes from the most favorable opinion for the plaintiff to the most unfavorable opinion for the plaintiff, until the number of votes gets over six. When the counted votes are over six, the most unfavorable opinion inside the votes over six are regarded as opinion of the Court.

Presiding Justice and Justice in charge 
In South Korea, among panel of Judges or Justices, there should be 'presiding member' and 'member in charge'. The presiding member is official representative of the panel. The member in charge is who oversees hearing and trial and writes draft judgment for each specific case. This role of 'member in charge' is mostly similar to Judge-Rapporteur in European Court of Justice. Usually the member in charge is automatically (or randomly) selected by computer to negate suspicion of partiality. However, the presiding member is bureaucratically selected by seniority. Due to this virtual difference in role, 'presiding Judge' in South Korean courts usually refer to which means such Judge is bureaucratically regarded as 'head of the panel', not who really takes role of presiding member in each of specific cases. For example, former Justice Kang Il-won was 'Justice in charge' in Impeachment of Park Geun-hye case, so he presided much of hearings, though official presiding member of the Full bench at that time was former Justice Lee Jung-mi as acting President of the Court.

Case naming 
Cases in the Constitutional Court are named as following rule. First two or four digit Arabic numbers indicate the year when the case is filed. And the following case code composed of Alphabets are categorized into eight; Hun-Ka, Na, Da, Ra, Ma, Ba, Sa and A. Each of the code matches with specific jurisdiction of the Court. The last serial number is given in the order of case filing of each year.

Jurisdiction 

Scope of jurisdiction of the Constitutional Court is defined in article 111(1) of the Constitution of South Korea, as following five categories; Adjudication on (1) constitutionality of statutes, (2) impeachment, (3) dissolution of a political party, (4) competence dispute and (5) constitutional complaint. While organizational status of South Korean Constitutional Court is mostly influenced from Austria, scope of jurisdiction is mostly influenced from Germany.

Judicial review of statutes 

According to article 111(1), 1. of the Constitution, the Constitutional Court may review constitutionality of law upon request of the courts. This is power of judicial review is officially named as Adjudication on the constitutionality of statutes in Chapter 4, Section 1 of the Constitutional Court Act, most prominent power of the Court. Since the power requires request from ordinary courts as preliminary condition for adjudication, and the ordinary courts of South Korea follows adversarial system as Nemo iudex sine actore, this power of Adjudication on the constitutionality of statutes is interpreted as power of 'concrete review of statutes', rather than 'abstract review of statutes'. It means judicial review on statute under article 111(1) 1. of the South Korean Constitution strictly requires specific case on-going in ordinary court as preliminary condition, and that case should cover issue on applying such statute. Any interested parties can claim to ordinary court to make request of judicial review to the Constitutional Court. When the court accept claim and makes request, on-going case in ordinary court is suspended by article 42(1) of the Act, until the Constitutional Court makes decision.

It is notable that according to article 41(1) of the Act, the request for the judicial review as Adjudication on the constitutionality of statutes is made by each of ordinary court, and any hierarchically superior court including the Supreme Court cannot intervene in whether such request is necessary or not by article 41(5) of the Act. This regulation was adopted to facilitate judicial review in South Korea, since the Supreme Court had history of passiveness in confronting other branches of government during age of authoritarian governments. Yet legislature of South Korea after democratization was a lot more concerned about whether the lower ordinary courts will really try to make such request, because much of the Judges in lower ordinary courts were tied to bureaucratic promotion system by the Supreme Court. This worry led legislature to build another detour to facilitate judicial review. The detour is embodied in as 'Constitutional complaint' by article 68(2) of the Act. By this article 68(2), when the ordinary court refuses to make request of judicial review to the Constitutional Court, any interested parties in on-going case in such ordinary court who were refused by that court to make request of judicial review, can directly make constitutional complaint to the Constitutional Court whether their basic rights are infringed by unconstitutional statute applied in on-going case at ordinary court. Thus, in summary, judicial review of statutes are carried out as two subtly different procedure of 'Adjudication on the constitutionality of statutes' and 'Adjudication on constitutional complaint under 68(2) of the Act'.

 Type of Upheld Decisions in both 'Adjudication on the constitutionality of statutes' and 'Adjudication on constitutional complaint under 68(2) of the Act'
 Unconstitutional : Decision upholding request. It nullifies adjudicated statute by 47(2) of the Act from the day of decision. Yet when the statute decided as unconstitutional is about criminal punishment, it is retroactively nullified, unless there is any precedent of the Court deciding such statute as constitutional. If there's such precedent, the statute is retroactively nullified from the following day of the day when latest precedent is made.
 Constitutional : Decision dismissing request.
 Nonconformity : Temporally constitutional until certain period of time set by the Court. This type of decision is derived type of 'Unconstitutional' to give the National Assembly (which is legislature) enough time to amend law. After the time set by the Court, the adjudicated statute is automatically nullified.
 Conditionally Unconstitutional, Conditionally Constitutional : A declaration that the adjudicated statute is currently constitutional, yet the statute must be interpreted in specific way which is aligned to constitutional order interpreted by the Constitutional Court. Thus, it is not an kind of upholding request from ordinary court. Rather, both 'Conditionally Unconstitutional' and 'Conditionally Constitutional' decision is derived type of 'Constitutional' decision with opinion of the Court suggesting certain way of interpreting the adjudicated statute. This kind of derivative decision is core issue of power struggle between the Constitutional Court and the Supreme Court.

Impeachment 

Impeachment adjudication is another prominent power of the Constitutional Court. According to article 65(1) of the Constitution, impeachment of officials in every branch of government with serious violation of constitution or statute is initiated by motion made in the National Assembly of South Korea, and adjudicated in Constitutional Court of Korea by article 111(1), 2. of the Constitution. The rejected impeachment of Roh Moo-hyun in year 2004 and upheld impeachment of Park Geun-hye in year 2017 are not only landmark decisions in record of the Court, but also in history of the Republic of Korea. However, the Constitution and the Constitutional Court Act never states about concrete standards about when to reject impeachment or not. Thus, these two different impeachment cases are materialized standards for decision on impeachment themselves as virtual case laws as precedents. For example, though the Constitution and the Act never requires how much the violation on the Constitution or statute should be serious to uphold impeachment, the first case law of Roh Moo-hyun impeachment requires 'grave' violation on statute as condition enough to justify removal of a public official from office. This 'grave violation' standard is not applied when impeached is troubled over violation on the Constitution.

Dissolution of political parties 

Article 8(4) of the Constitution is institution for defensive democracy. When purposes or activities of a political party are contrary to the 'fundamental democratic order', the Government may file a request to the Constitutional Court to adjudicate whether the party should be dissolved and prohibited, which is power granted to the Constitutional Court by article 111(1), 3. of the Constitution. This adjudication system, formally known as Adjudication on dissolution of a political party is an institution directly influenced by German institution called 'Party Ban', where ban on political party is adjudicated by the German Constitutional Court. While Germans used this institution to defense German democracy mainly from Neo-Nazism in 1950s, South Koreans worried North Korea may plot soft regime change inside South Korean democracy. This national worry got finally brought out as South Korean government requesting dissolution of the 'Unified Progressive Party (UPP)' in November 2013, based on claims that the purposes and activities of UPP are based on North Korean Socialism, which is contrary to fundamental democratic order. The Constitutional Court upheld government request in December 2014 with 8-to-1 ruling, as Lee Seok-ki and other leading members of UPP were turned out to be having secret plots to overthrow South Korean government. After decision, whether not only punishing Lee Seok-ki and its gang by criminal liability, yet dissolving and prohibiting whole UPP was necessary or not was contentious issue inside South Korean jurists.

Competence disputes 
The Adjudication on competence dispute under article 111(1), 4. of the Constitution is another institution directly influenced by German institution called 'Organs Dispute'. In this procedure, organs specified in the Constitution can participate in adjudication under adversarial system, to determine exact demarcation of each organ's constitutional and statutory power. South Korean constitution defines organs available to participate in competence dispute as 'State agencies' and 'Local governments' which have legal ground on level of Constitution, thus organs established by legislature cannot participate in competence dispute.

Constitutional complaints 

According to article 111(1), 5. of the Constitution and article 68(1) of Constitutional Court Act, the Court may review whether basic right of the plaintiff is infringed by any public authorities. Influenced by German institution called Verfassungsbeschwerde, this Adjudication on Constitutional complaint system is designed as last resort for defending basic rights under the Constitution. Thus basically, the Court can adjudicate the complaint only if when other possible remedies are exhausted. Yet the Adjudication on Constitutional complaint is not accompanied with lawsuits on civil liability, since judgment on civil liability is role of ordinary courts. The Court only reviews whether the basic right of the plaintiff is infringed or not in this adjudication process. Detailed issues on calculation of damage and compensation is out of the Court's jurisdiction. This type of adjudications are usually dismissed in Prior review due to lack of preliminary conditions.

In addition, there's another unique type of constitutional complaint under article 68(2) of the Act, as discussed above in paragraph of 'on Constitutionality of statutes'. This constitutional complaint by article 68(2) of the Act is detour for Adjudication on the constitutionality of statutes (or judicial review) denied by ordinary courts. It is usually called as '' in Korean, which means constitutional complaint especially on statutes. As this type of constitutional complaint is designed as detour for judicial review, the preliminary conditions required in Prior review for constitutional complaint under article 68(2) is different from the complaints under article 68(1) of the Act. It does not require any possible remedies to be exhausted already, but requires the plaintiff was dismissed of claim for judicial review from the ordinary court about on-going case of the plaintiff. It is notifiable that on-going case is not automatically sustained during Adjudication on Constitutional complaint by article 68(2) of the Act.

Statistics 
Below are the aggregated statistics as of 09 Feb 2021.

International relations 
 Venice Commission : As the Republic of Korea is a member state of the Venice Commission, one of associate Justices in Constitutional Court of Korea becomes member for the Commission. Substitute members are conventionally designated in following two positions; Deputy Secretary General at the Court's Department of Court Administration, and Deputy Minister of Ministry of Justice. Current member is Justice Lee Suk-Tae.

 Association of Asian Constitutional Courts and Equivalent Institutions : The Republic of Korea is founding member state of the Association of Asian Constitutional Courts & Equivalent Institutions (AACC), and seat for permanent secretariat of the AACC. President of the Constitutional Court of Korea attends the Board of AACC as representing the Republic of Korea.

Criticism and Issues 
It is noteworthy that according to the article 113(1) of South Korean Constitution, the Constitutional Court cannot make upholding decision when there's not enough number of Justices appointed to meet quorum, yet there is no contingency plan for massive vacancy of Justices. While there is no contingency plan in the Constitution, even article 6(4) and (5) of Constitutional Court Act only requires vacancy should be filled in 30 days, without any meaningful contingency plan when such 30 days passes. This situation makes the Constitutional Court of Korea vulnerable to be paralyzed by politics between the President of South Korea and the legislature. While this problem is also happening in the Supreme Court of Korea, the problem of the Constitutional Court is much worse as the article 113(1) strictly requires there should be at least six Constitutional Court Justices to make upholding decision. The Supreme Court only requires simple majority for any decision.

Relationship with the Supreme Court 
The relationship between the Constitutional Court of Korea and the Supreme Court of Korea is a hotly debated topic among Korean jurists. The Constitution does not establish a clear hierarchy between the two highest courts, and the ranks of the respective chief justices are equal under the Constitutional Court Act. Since the coequal relationship of the courts relies on a piece of legislation, the National Assembly could pass an amendment and rank the heads of the courts differently, which would resolve this issue. However, as it stands, there is no remedy if the two highest courts disagree on a constitutional case.

There are several areas where the two highest courts have come into conflict. Most notably, jurisdiction over executive orders, which include presidential decrees and ordinances, can fall on either court depending on the interpretation. Article 107(2) of the Constitution states the Supreme Court shall preside over and have the final say in cases concerning the legality of executive orders. However, the Constitutional Court has held that a litigant may file a complaint directly with the Constitutional Court if the litigant believes his or her constitutional rights were infringed upon by an executive order. The Constitution also grants the Constitutional Court jurisdiction over complaints of constitutional violations as prescribed by an act of the National Assembly. In addition, the Constitutional Court Act gives the Constitutional Court the authority to review the constitutionality of all government actions. Since the Constitution itself empowers both courts to hear the same cases, this puts the two courts into endless strife. 

The highest courts also fiercely disagree over the Constitutional Court's power to declare a law unconstitutional as applied, which means the statute itself is constitutional but as it is applied by either the executive branch or inferior courts does run afoul of the Constitution. The Supreme Court of Korea does not recognize the binding power of such "unconstitutional as applied" decisions by the Constitutional Court, as the Supreme Court interprets such decisions as essentially upholding the statutes in dispute. This indicates that the Supreme Court may ignore such decisions and proceed as it sees fit, which has happened several times. The Constitutional Court may counter this by suspending state powers that may violate the Constitution, which the Constitutional Court interprets to include the Supreme Court's decision to hear a case. The Constitutional Court suspended Supreme Court trials once in 1997 and twice in 2022, all of which brought the nation on the verge of a constitutional crisis.

As both courts claim sharply divergent, conflicting interpretations of their powers and the Constitution does not expressly state which court has the final say, there is no way to resolve such conflicts within the current system.

Gallery

See also 

 Constitution of South Korea
 Politics of South Korea
 Government of South Korea
 Judiciary of South Korea
 President of the Constitutional Court of Korea
 List of justices of the Constitutional Court of Korea
 Rapporteur Judge
 Supreme Court of Korea
 Venice Commission
 Association of Asian Constitutional Courts and Equivalent Institutions

References

External links
 the Constitutional Court of Korea Official Website
 The Constitution of the Republic of Korea (translated into English), Korea Legislation Research Institute
 Constitutional Court Act (translated into English), Korea Legislation Research Institute
 Thirty Years of the Constitutional Court of Korea (1988-2018), published and downloadable by the Constitutional Court of Korea

Constitutional Court of Korea
Korea, Republic of
Judiciary of South Korea
Law of South Korea
Korea, Republic of
1988 establishments in South Korea
Courts and tribunals established in 1988
Jongno District